Salvador (Puig Antich) (or Salvador) is a 2006 film directed by Manuel Huerga. It is based on the 2001 Francesc Escribano book , which depicts the time Salvador Puig Antich spent on death row prior to his execution by garrote (the last person to be executed by this method in Spain) in 1974, in the last rales of the Francoist dictatorship.

The film was screened in the Un Certain Regard section at the 2006 Cannes Film Festival.

Cast
Daniel Brühl as Salvador Puig Antich
Tristán Ulloa as Oriol Arau
Leonardo Sbaraglia as Jesús Irurre
Leonor Watling as Cuca
Ingrid Rubio as Margalida
Celso Bugallo as Salvador's father
Mercedes Sampietro as Salvador's mother
Olalla Escribano as Imma Puig
Carlota Olcina as Carme Puig
Bea Segura as Montse Puig
Andrea Ros as Merçona Puig
Jacob Torres as Santi Soler
Joel Joan as Oriol Solé
Pau Derqui as Jordi Solé
Oriol Vila as Ignasi Solé
Raül Tortosa as Quim Puig Antich

References

Further reading

External links
 The Great Swindle: 'This is not the tale of Salvador Puig Antich'
 
 A memorial from Salvador Puig Antich versus MediaPro film (in Catalan)

2000s political drama films
2006 films
British biographical drama films
2000s Catalan-language films
Films about anarchism
Films about bank robbery
Films about capital punishment
Films directed by Manuel Huerga
Films set in Barcelona
Films set in Spain
Films set in the 1970s
Films shot in Barcelona
Francoist Spain
2000s French-language films
Spanish biographical drama films
2000s Spanish-language films
2006 multilingual films
British multilingual films
Spanish multilingual films
2000s British films
2000s Spanish films
2000s prison drama films
Spanish prison films